Antalyaspor Kulübü is a Turkish professional football club located in the city of Antalya. The club's colours are red and white. They play their home matches at the Antalya Stadium. In Turkey, the club won the First League twice in 1982 and 1986 and finished as runners-up for the Turkish Cup in 2000 and in 2021.

History
Antalyaspor was established in 1966 when three local teams (Yenikapı SuSpor, İlk Işıkspor and Ferrokromspor) united to establish a club for the coastal city of Antalya. The club competed in the lower divisions of the Turkish football league system before promotion to the Süper Lig in 1982–83. Their first stint of top-flight football lasted for two years, and they were relegated to the TFF First League at the end of the 1984–85 season. Though promoted to the next season they were relegated again. They competed in the TFF First League until the end of the 1993–94 season, when they beat İstanbulspor 3–2 in the final playoffs. Their longest stint of top-flight football lasted until 2001–02.

During that time span, the club competed in the UEFA Intertoto Cup twice and the UEFA Cup once. They reached the finals of the Turkish Cup in 2000 but lost 5–3 to Galatasaray. Antalyaspor competed in the UEFA Cup the following season, defeating Werder Bremen 2–0 before losing 6–0 in the second leg.

The club was relegated at the end of the 2001–02 season, finishing one point below the relegation zone. The club earned promotion back to the Süper Lig after placing second in the 2005–06 1.Lig. On 3 December 2006, Pavol Straka scored the club's 500th goal in top-flight football. In the following year they were relegated back to the TFF First League, but earned promotion again the next season. They finished ninth at the end of the 2009–10 season.

Finished the regular fixtures of 2014–15 TFF First League season at 4th place, Antalyaspor beat Samsunspor at play-off finals with 6–3 after Penalty shoot-outs on 7 June 2015 and promoted to Süper Lig once again, spending only one season at TFF First League.

Sponsorship naming
Medical Park Antalyaspor 2010–2014
Fraport TAV Antalyaspor 2020–present

Colours and badge
The club emblem includes capital letters A and S which stands for Antalya and Spor (sport in Turkish) respectively. In the middle of these letters, there is the figure of Yivli Minare which is one of the several symbols of the city of Antalya. Three rectangular shapes on the Yivli Minare represent the unity of the three teams of Antalya.

Stadium

Antalya's first stadium was Antalya Atatürk Stadium which fell into disrepair from 2009 onwards and forced the first team to relocate to Akdeniz University Stadium which holds 7,083 spectators. It is located on the Mediterranean coast of Turkey and is owned by Akdeniz University. In 2013 Antalyaspor began construction of their new stadium, Antalya Stadium. This stadium, which opened in the summer of 2015, seats 33,032 spectators and features a football park, education centre, football academy, and extra training pitches to host camps of European or Asian teams. The stadium is nicknamed "100. Yıl" (Centenary), after the major artery of the same name, "100. Yıl Bulvarı", which passes directly south of the plot.  This thoroughfare was named in commemoration of the 100th birthday of Mustafa Kemal Atatürk, founder of the Republic of Turkey.

Honours
1. Lig
Winners: 1981–82, 1985–86
Runners-up: 2005–06, 2007–08

Turkish Cup
Runners-up: 1999–2000, 2020–21

Turkish Super Cup
Runners-up: 2021

League affiliation
Süper Lig: 1982–85, 1986–87, 1994–02, 2006–07, 2008–14, 2015–
TFF First League: 1966–82, 1985–86, 1987–94, 2002–06, 2007–08, 2014–15

Statistics

Domestic seasons

European history

Players

Current squad

Other players under contract

Out on loan

Club officials

Technical staff

Board members

Coaching history

References

Footnotes

Citations

Further reading

External links
Official website
Antalyaspor on TFF.org

 
Football clubs in Turkey
Association football clubs established in 1966
1966 establishments in Turkey
Süper Lig clubs
Sports teams in Antalya